Ambre Ballenghien (born 13 December 2000) is a Belgian field hockey player, who plays as a striker.

Career

Junior National Team
In 2017, Ambre Ballenghien made her first appearance for a Belgian junior team at the EuroHockey Junior Championship in Valencia. At the tournament, Belgium won their first medal at the tournament, finishing second after losing in the final.

Senior National Team
Ballenghien made her senior international debut in 2017, in a test match against Germany. During the match, she scored her first international goal.

In 2019, Ballenghien was a member of the Belgian team in the inaugural FIH Pro League. The team finished in fifth place, eight places above their pre tournament ranking of 13th. Throughout the tournament, Ballenghien scored 3 goals.

International Goals

References

2000 births
Living people
Belgian female field hockey players
Field hockey players from Brussels